UKK Bosna or Univerzitetski Karate Klub Bosna is a karate club from Sarajevo, Bosnia. The club was founded in May 1967. The club is part of the University Sport Society USD Bosna. UKK bosna is a member of the Bosnian Karate Federation.

The club often participates in international competitions and events.

In particular, between 1984 and 1992 the club had much success on the international stage. This was complicated by the war that lasted between 1992 and 1995.

A success story UKK Bosna has been operating in the family of the University Sports Association "Bosna" as a club that has been a pioneer of karate in Bosnia and Herzegovina since 1967 and the founder of the Karate Federation of BiH since 1972. Apart from active karate players, the club presidents from 1967 to 1992, Zdravko Bartal, Gojko Vukadinović, Suad Behmen, Marjan Maričić, Lazo Vukomanić, Božidar Anzulović, Ibrahim Uštović, Luka Popović and Sladjan Ajvaz, also made a special contribution to the work of the club. 1992 to the present day Ibrahim Uštović and Šačir Boškalio.All leaders of UKK Bosna have a high degree in karate and are elected from among the members of the club. Bosnia is not just a club, a school, but an institute where teams of experts work, not only for karate, but also in the field of medicine, physiology, biomechanics, psychology, etc. with the aim of advancing karate. University Karate Club Bosnia Sarajevo, Hamze Hume no. 2, 71000 Sarajevo, Bosnia and Herzegovina is a member of the Karate Federation of the Federation of Bosnia and Herzegovina and the Karate Federation of Bosnia and Herzegovina, which are recognized as national federations by the Ministry of Justice of BiH and the Ministry of Civil Sports Sector at VMBiH. UKK Bosna Sarajevo has inherited the tradition of karate in the area of the Socialist Federal Republic of Yugoslavia and Bosnia and Herzegovina since 1967, ie since 1972 when KSBiH was founded Integrating the positive experience and successful tradition of previous generations, UKK Bosna is one of the most massive and successful clubs in BiH and the Balkans, with over 20 clubs with more than 50,000 athletes, professionals, professional and administrative staff and club friends.

Honors
European Champion:
Winners (1) : 2003

References

External links
Official Site, karatebosna.com/

Sport in Sarajevo